The 2016 North Carolina lieutenant gubernatorial election took place on November 8, 2016, to elect the Lieutenant Governor of North Carolina, concurrently with the 2016 U.S. presidential election, as well as elections to the United States Senate and elections to the United States House of Representatives and various state and local elections. Primary elections were held March 15.

In North Carolina, the Governor and Lieutenant Governor are elected separately.

Incumbent Republican Lieutenant Governor Dan Forest ran for re-election to a second term in office. Linda Coleman was the Democratic nominee, making the general election a rematch of the 2012 contest that Forest won by a narrow margin.

Forest won re-election to a second term, despite Republican Governor Pat McCrory losing reelection by a narrow margin.

Republican primary

Candidates

Declared
 Dan Forest, incumbent Lieutenant Governor

Democratic primary

Candidates

Declared
 Linda Coleman, former Director of the Office of State Personnel, former State Representative and nominee for Lieutenant Governor in 2012
 Holly Jones, Buncombe County Commissioner
 Ron Newton, tax attorney and financial services company owner
 Robert Wilson, former North Carolina Assistant Secretary of State

Declined
 Gene McLaurin, former State Senator and former Mayor of Rockingham
 Steve Rao, Morrisville Town Councilman
 Chris Rey, Mayor of Spring Lake (running for U.S. Senate)
 James Taylor, Winston-Salem City Council Member

Results

Libertarian primary

Candidates

Declared
  Jacki Cole, marketing/sales professional

Withdrawn
 J.J. Summerell, chairman of the Libertarian Party of North Carolina (running for Congress instead of for Lt. Governor)

General election

Polling

Results

References

External links
Dan Forest for Lieutenant Governor (R)
Linda Coleman for Lieutenant Governor (D)

2016
North Carolina
Lieutenant Governor